Ines Gmati (born 5 April 1997) is a Tunisian sailor. At the 2016 Summer Olympics she competed in the Women's laser radial.

References

External links
 
 
 

1997 births
Living people
Tunisian female sailors (sport)
Olympic sailors of Tunisia
Sailors at the 2016 Summer Olympics – Laser Radial
African Games gold medalists for Tunisia
African Games medalists in sailing
Competitors at the 2011 All-Africa Games
20th-century Tunisian women
21st-century Tunisian women
Place of birth missing (living people)